Katrina Bryan (born 10 July 1980) is a Scottish actress and CBeebies presenter who has starred in Taggart, Nina and the Neurons, See You, See Me and Sea of Souls. She has been active since 1999. Bryan has a BA in Acting from Edinburgh’s Queen Margaret University. She appeared in an Irn-Bru advert where she names her newborn baby Fanny, much to the shock of the baby's father.

Personal life
In 2015, she started dating her long term partner Richard McCourt and they currently reside in Wilmslow together. In 2019, Bryan confirmed their engagement via her instagram page.

Television and film credits 
 ITV ‘’Emmerdale’’ - TV - (2020) - Eloise
CBeebies ‘’Swashbuckle’’ - TV - (2019) Arrlice
CBeebies Molly and Mack - TV - (2018-present) - Alice
CBeebies CBeebies Christmas Show:Thumbelina - TV - (2018) - Thumbelina
CBeebies ‘’CBeebies presents The Nutcracker’’’’ - TV - (2016) - The Sugar Plum Fairy 
CBeebies ‘’Panto:Alice in Wonderland - (2015) - TV - Alice’s Mum
CBeebies ‘’Panto:Peter Pan’’ - TV - (2014)- TV - Wendy Darling
CBeebies ‘’Swashbuckle’’ - (2014) - TV - Nina
CBeebies ‘’A CBeebies Christmas Carol’’ - TV - (2013) - Friend of Christmas Present
CBeebies ‘’Panto:Jack and the Beanstalk’’ - TV - (2012) - Princess Nina
CBeebies Panto:Strictly Cinderella - TV - (2011) - Cinderella
CBeebies ‘’Panto:Aladdin’’ - TV - (2010) - So-Shi
CBeebies ‘’ Panto:Jack and Jill’’ - (2009) - Nina
Asylum - Short Film - (2011) - Director Jorn Utkilen - Teacher
Rab C Nesbitt - Series 9, episode 1 'Heal' - TV - (2010) – Dr. Lennox
Wind Over Lake - Film - (2010) - Imagine Pictures - Katrina
Taggart - TV - (2007–2010) – Ellis Sinclair
CBeebies Nina and the Neurons - TV - (2007–2015, 2019, 2021) – Nina
Night People - (BAFTA Award Winning Film) - (2005) – Jane
Size 5 -Short Film - (2005) - Imagine Pictures - Shop Assistant
Paper Anniversary - Short Film - (2004) - Imagine Pictures - Waitress
See you, See me - TV - (2004) – Tess Macalli
Sea of Souls - TV - (2004) - Radio Presenter
Ancient Greece - TV - (BBC Education) - (2004) - Persephone & Chorus
The Toon Fair - (2001) – Special Guest
Who's My Favourite Girl ? - Short Film - (1999) – May

Theatre credits

Local Hero - (March–May 2019)  - Royal Lyceum Theatre, Edinburgh - Stella
Beauty and the Beast - (Dec 2014/Jan 2015) - Gaiety Theatre, Ayr - Beauty
Sleeping Beauty - (November 2012 - January 2013) - Evolution Productions - The Marlowe Theatre, Canterbury - The Good Fairy
Beauty and the Beast - (December 2011) - Mad About Productions - DG One - Dumfries and Galloway - Beauty
My Romantic History- (2011) - Borderline Theatre Company - Director Jemima Levick -  Sasha
Jack & The Beanstalk - (Dec 2009/Jan 2010) - Eden Court Theatre, Inverness - The Flower Fairy
Mother Bruce - (Dec 2008/Jan 2009) - Tron Theatre, Glasgow - Samolina Salamander
Eeting Beauty - (Dec 2007/Jan 2008) - Tron Theatre, Glasgow - Princess Bess
Dick McWittington - (Nov-Dec 2006) - Brunton Theatre, Musselburgh - Alice Fitzwarren
Hambledog and His Hopping Clogs - (2005) - Perissology Theatre Company - Granny Hobble
A Virgins Guide To Rocky Horror - (2005) - Daemonmedia Scotland - Janet
Jack & The Beanstalk - (Nov-Dec 2004) - Brunton Theatre, Musselburgh - Jill
Death Of A Salesman - (2004) Royal Lyceum Theatre, Edinburgh - Letta & Jenny
The Chrysalids - (2003) - Complete Productions - Anne
Greggs - The Musical - Gilded Balloon - (2003) - Gilded Balloon Productions - Fiona
Houghmagandie Pack - (2003) - Grid Iron - Jean Armour
Sleeping Beauty - (Dec 2002/Jan 2003) - Eden Court Theatre, Inverness - Princess Beauty
Parking Lot In Pittsburg - (2002)- Byre Theatre, St Andrews - Nurse & (Acting ASM)
A Midsummer Night's Dream - (2002) - Brunton Theatre, Musselburgh - Helena
Sleeping Beauty - (Nov 2001/Jan 2002) - Brunton Theatre, Musselburgh - Princess Luminessa
If I Die B 4 U Wake - (2001) - Theatre Workshop - Shonagh

Radio credits

Newsmash - Comedy Unit/BBC Scotland - (2009) - Sally Moore (News Anchor)
Death and the Penguin - BBC Radio 3 - (2006) - Nina

References

External links

Katrina Bryan at her agent's website

1980 births
Living people
21st-century Scottish actresses
Alumni of Queen Margaret University
People from Dumfries and Galloway
Scottish stage actresses
Scottish television actresses